This is a list about the foreign players who played in the Swiss Super League. To be in the list players must meet two criteria:
 They must have to have played at list one game in the Swiss Super League 
 The players who were signed by a Super League club but played in lower categories and/or in European competition must not be in the list
In bold: players who are currently playing in the Swiss Super League after playing at least one match.

Swiss players born abroad are included, too.

Swiss players born abroad 
  Almen Abdi – Zürich – 2003–09
  Nicholas Ammeter – Young Boys – 2021–22
  Patrick Baumann – Grasshopper, Zürich, Thun, Neuchâtel Xamax – 1998–2007
  Valon Behrami – Lugano, Sion – 2002–03, 2019–20
  Nicky Beloko – Sion – 2017–18
  Johan Berisha – Neuchâtel Xamax, Thun, Young Boys, Aarau – 1997–2007
  Raúl Cabanas – Grasshopper – 2006–08
  Önder Çengel – Grasshopper, Thun – 2003–04, 2005–06
  Ambrosio Da Costa – Sion – 2016–17
 Johan Djourou – Sion, Neuchâtel Xamax – 2019–20
  Kwadwo Duah – Young Boys, St. Gallen – 2016–17, 2020–
  Slaviša Dugić – Servette, Aarau, Yverdon-Sport – 2003–06
  Blerim Džemaili – Zürich – 2003–07, 2020–
  Breel Embolo – Basel – 2013–16
  Innocent Emeghara – Grasshoppers – 2010–12
  Norbert Eschmann – FC Lausanne-Sport, Servette, Sion, Young Boys 1951–54, 1955–58, 1963–67
  Sehar Fejzulahi – Aarau, Vaduz, Grasshopper – 2004–06, 2008–09, 2011–12
  Beg Ferati – Basel, Sion 2007–11, 2013–14
  Gelson Fernandes – Sion 2005–07, 2012–13
  Roman Friedli – Yverdon Sport, Aarau, Young Boys, Thun – 1999–2008
  Alessandro Frigerio – Lugano, Bellinzona, Chiasso 1940–43, 1946–47, 1948–49
  Ulisses Garcia – Grasshopper, Young Boys – 2013–14, 2018–
  Lorenzo González – St. Gallen – 2020–21
  Bernt Haas – Grasshopper, Basel, St. Gallen – 1994–2001, 2002–03, 2007–08
  Selver Hodžić – Luzern, Thun, Neuchâtel Xamax – 1999–2000, 2002–07, 2008–10
  Olivier Jäckle – Aarau – 2013–15
  Eldin Jakupović – Grasshopper, Thun – 2004–06, 2007–09
  Goran Karanović – Luzern, Servette, St. Gallen – 2008–09, 2011–15
  Timm Klose – Thun – 2010–11
  Iván Knez – Luzern, Basel, Young Boys – 1994–2002, 2003–05
  Živko Kostadinović – Zürich – 2021–
  Samir Kozarac – St. Gallen – 2006–07
  Baykal Kulaksızoğlu – Grasshopper, Thun, Basel, Young Boys, Aarau – 2001–06, 2007–10
 Granit Lekaj – Winterthur – 2022–
 Badile Lubamba – Luzern, Lugano, Neuchâtel Xamax – 1999–2002, 2005–06
 Christopher Lungoyi – Lugano, St. Gallen – 2019–
  Mobulu M'Futi – Sion, Neuchâtel Xamax, Aarau, Servette – 1999–2005, 2007–10, 2011–12
  Boban Maksimović – Young Boys – 2003–05
  Sokol Maliqi – Luzern – 2006–07
  Neftali Manzambi – Basel – 2016–18
  Oliver Maric – Luzern, Schaffhausen – 1999–2003, 2004–06
  Admir Mehmedi – Zürich – 2008–12
  Genc Mehmeti – Luzern, Bellinzona – 2002–03, 2006–07, 2008–10
  Elvir Melunović – Aarau, Servette, Grasshopper, Young Boys, Schaffhausen – 1996–2006
  Dragan Mihajlović – Bellinzona, Lugano – 2008–11, 2016–19
  Nikola Milosavljevic – Lugano, Sion – 2015–18
  Miloš Malenović – Grasshopper, St. Gallen, Neuchâtel Xamax – 2003–04, 2006–08
  François Moubandje – Servette – 2011–13
  Juan Manuel Muñoz – Neuchâtel Xamax – 2003–04, 2005–06
  Orhan Mustafi – Zürich, Basel, Aarau, Grasshopper – 2007–10, 2011–13
  Freddy Mveng – Neuchâtel Xamax, Young Boys, FC Lausanne-Sport, Sion – 2009–12, 2013–14, 2016–20
  Yvon Mvogo – Young Boys – 2013–17
  Yago Gomes do Nascimento – Vaduz – 2020–21
  Markus Neumayr – Thun, Vaduz, Luzern 2010–11, 2014–17
  Adrian Nikçi – Zürich, Thun, Young Boys – 2007–12, 2013–15
  Blaise Nkufo – FC Lausanne-Sport, Grasshopper, Lugano, Luzern – 1993–94, 1997–2001
  Dimitri Oberlin – Zürich, Basel – 2013–14, 2017–20
  Christophe Ohrel – FC Lausanne-Sport, Servette, Luzern – 1987–94, 1996–2002
  David Pallas – Zürich, Thun – 1998–2005
  Roger Pasquini – FC Lausanne-Sport – 1934–35
  Vladimir Petković – Sion – 1988–89
  Richmond Rak – Grasshopper, Neuchâtel Xamax – 2006–09
  Milaim Rama – Thun, Schaffhausen – 2002–04, 2005–08, 2010–12
  Alain Rochat – Yverdon Sport, Young Boys, Zürich, FC Lausanne-Sport – 1999–2005, 2006–11, 2013–18
  Leonel Romero – Grasshopper – 2005–07, 2008–09
  Francesco Ruberto – Thun – 2015–18
  Vero Salatić – Grasshopper, Sion – 2003–11, 2012–17
  Alvyn Sanches – FC Lausanne-Sport – 2020–
  Stéphane Sarni – Sion, Servette – 1997–99, 2000–01, 2003–04, 2006–10
  Nenad Savić – Grasshopper, Neuchâtel Xamax, Basel, Thun – 1998–2006
  Ilan Sauter – Zürich – 2019–20
  Lukas Schenkel – Thun, St. Gallen, Thun – 2004–06, 2009–11, 2013–15
  Stephan Seiler – Zürich – 2019–
  Nezbedin Selimi – Wil 1900 – 2003–04
  Rijat Shala – Lugano, Grasshopper – 2000–04
  Xherdan Shaqiri – Basel – 2009–12
  Emir Sinanović – Aarau – 2008–10
  Dejan Sorgić – Luzern, Thun – 2006–07, 2008–13, 2016–
  Albert Spahiu – Young Boys – 2010–11
  Remo Staubli – Zürich, Aarau – 2006–09, 2013–14
  Nestor Subiat – Lugano, Grasshopper – 1992–97
  Bashkim Sukaj – FC Lausanne-Sport – 2012–13
  Scott Sutter – Grasshopper, Zürich, Young Boys – 2004–17
  Igor Tadić – St. Gallen – 2012–13
  Pierluigi Tami – Bellinzona, Lugano – 1988–93
  Christopher Teichmann – Aarau – 2013–14
  Yannick Toure – Young Boys – 2021–
  Cédric Tsimba – Servette – 2001–02, 2003–04
  Marc Tsoungui – FC Lausanne-Sport – 2020–
  Max Veloso – Neuchâtel Xamax, Sion – 2009–10, 2011–14
  Matias Vitkieviez – Servette, Young Boys, St. Gallen – 2011–15
  Johan Vonlanthen – Young Boys, Zürich, Grasshopper – 2001–04, 2009–10, 2013–14

Albania 
Amir Abrashi – Grasshopper, Basel – 2010–15, 2020–
 Ansi Agolli – Neuchâtel Xamax, Luzern – 2005–07
 Arlind Ajeti – Basel – 2011–15
 Naser Aliji – Basel, Vaduz – 2013–16
Albion Avdijaj – Grasshopper, Vaduz – 2013–24, 2015–18
 Nedim Bajrami – Grasshopper – 2016–19
 Migjen Basha – Luzern – 2015–16
 Vullnet Basha – Grasshopper, Neuchâtel Xamax, Sion – 2009–14
 Berat Djimsiti – Zürich – 2011–16
Arbnor Fejzullahu – Neuchâtel Xamax – 2018–19
 Shkëlzen Gashi – Zürich, Bellinzona, Neuchâtel Xamax, Grasshopper, Basel – 2006–07, 2008–11, 2012–16
 Jürgen Gjasula – St. Gallen, Basel – 2005–09
 Jahmir Hyka – Luzern – 2011–17
Florian Kamberi – Grasshopper, St. Gallen, Winterthur – 2015–17, 2020–
 Burim Kukeli – Luzern, Zürich, Sion – 2007–19
Ermir Lenjani – Grasshopper, St. Gallen, Sion – 2010–11, 2012–15, 2017–20
Bujar Lika – Grasshopper – 2017–19
 Haxhi Neziraj – Luzern – 2012–15
 Arijan Qollaku – Grasshopper – 2016–18
 Armando Sadiku – Zürich, Vaduz, Lugano – 2013–17
 Taulant Seferi – Young Boys, Neuchâtel Xamax – 2014–15, 2016–17, 2019–
Denis Simani – Vaduz – 2020–
 Daniel Xhafaj – Neuchâtel Xamax – 2005–06
 Taulant Xhaka – Basel, Grasshopper – 2010–
 Frédéric Veseli – Lugano – 2015–16
 Mirson Volina – Thun – 2007–08, 2010–13

Algeria 
Ayoub Abdellaoui – Sion – 2018–21
Hocine Achiou – Aarau – 2006–07
Lakhdar Adjali – Sion – 1998–99
Mohamed El Amine Amoura – Lugano – 2021–
Olivier Boumelaha – Basel, St. Gallen – 1999–2003
Khaled Gourmi – Young Boys – 2009–10
Yacine Hima – Aarau, Bellinzona – 2006–07, 2008–10
Yassin Maouche – Zürich – 2017–19
Djamel Mesbah – Servette, Basel, Aarau, Luzern, FC Lausanne-Sport – 2003–09, 2017–18
Rachid Mekhloufi – Servette – 1961–62
Hemza Mihoubi – Bellinzona – 2009–11
Nordine Sam – Luzern – 2006–07
Liazid Sandjak – Neuchâtel Xamax – 1996–98
Yannis Tafer – FC Lausanne-Sport, St. Gallen – 2012–19
Hussayn Touati – Servette – 2022–

Andorra 
 Ildefons Lima – Bellinzona – 2008–11

Angola 
 Joaquim Adão – Sion – 2009–10, 2011–13, 2015–18
 Guilherme Afonso – Sion, Grasshopper – 2008–10, 2011–12
 Edgar André – Sion – 2019–21
Signori António – FC Lausanne-Sport, Basel – 2012–14, 2017–19
 Genséric Kusunga – Basel, Servette – 2010–13
Dereck Kutesa – Basel, Luzern, St. Gallen – 2016–20
Afimico Pululu – Basel, Neuchâtel Xamax– 2017–22

Argentina 
 David Abraham – Basel – 2008–12
 Oscar Román Acosta – Servette – 1989–90
 Francisco Aguirre – Yverdon Sport FC, St. Gallen – 2005–08
Ignacio Aliseda – Lugano – 2021–
 Federico Almerares – Basel – 2008–10
Nicolás Andereggen – Zürich – 2018–19
 Mariano Armentano – Basel – 1996–97
 Juan Barbas – Locarno, Sion – 1990–93
 César Carignano – Basel – 2004–08
 José Chatruc – Grasshopper – 2003–04
 Néstor Clausen – Sion – 1989–94
 Emiliano Ariel Dudar – Bellinzona, Young Boys – 2008–12
 Iván Furios – Neuchâtel Xamax – 2007–09
 Juan Esnáider Ruiz – FC Lausanne-Sport – 2016–17
 Adrián Fernández – St. Gallen – 2007–08
 Fernando Gamboa – Grasshopper – 2003–04
 Juan Pablo Garat – St. Gallen, Aarau – 2005–08, 2013–15
 Marcos Gelabert – St. Gallen, Basel, Neuchâtel Xamax – 2006–12
 Christian Eduardo Giménez – Lugano, Basel – 1998–2005
 Francisco Gabriel Guerrero – Zürich, Basel, Aarau – 2001–05, 2007–09
 Guillermo Imhoff – Sion – 2009–11
 José Luis Mamone – Luzern – 2006–07
Leandro Marín – FC Lausanne-Sport – 2017–18
 Javier Mazzoni – FC Lausanne-Sport – 1999–2000
 Jesús Méndez – St. Gallen – 2006–07
Leonel Mosevich – St. Gallen – 2018–19
Matías Palacios – Basel – 2020–
 Guillermo Pereyra – Young Boys – 2008–09
 Julio Hernán Rossi – Lugano, Basel, Neuchâtel Xamax – 1998–2006, 2007–10
 Walter Samuel – Basel – 2014–16
 Leonardo Sánchez – Zürich – 2015–16
 Gastón Sauro – Basel – 2012–14
 Ezequiel Óscar Scarione – Thun, Luzern, St. Gallen – 2006–09, 2010–11, 2012–13
 Fernando Screpis – Sion – 2002–03
 Dante Senger – Aarau – 2013–15
 Darío Siviski – Servette – 1990–91, 1992–93
 Carlos Daniel Tapia – Lugano – 1991–92
Milton Valenzuela – Lugano – 2022-
 Javier Villarreal – Grasshopper – 2004–05
 Nelson Vivas – Lugano – 1997–98
Gonzalo Zárate – Grasshopper, Young Boys, FC Thun, Vaduz, FC Lausanne-Sport – 2007–10, 2012–18

Armenia 
 Vardan Minasyan – FC Lausanne-Sport – 1998–99
 Artur Petrosyan – Zürich – 2003–06
 Armen Shahgeldyan – FC Lausanne-Sport – 1998–2000
Artem Simonyan – Zürich – 2015–16
 Vahe Tadevosyan – Aarau – 2006–07
 Harutyun Vardanyan – FC Lausanne-Sport, Young Boys, Servette, Aarau – 1997–98, 2001–06

Australia 
 Paul Agostino – Young Boys – 1992–94
 Ross Aloisi – Aarau – 1996–97
 Oliver Bozanic – Luzern – 2013–15
 Scott Chipperfield – Basel – 2001–12
 Joel Griffiths – Neuchâtel Xamax – 2003–06
 Tomi Juric – Luzern – 2016–19
 Ljubo Milicevic – Zürich, Basel, Thun, Young Boys – 2001–07
Trent Sainsbury – Grasshopper – 2017–18
 Kostas Salapasidis – Lugano – 2000–01
 Mile Sterjovski – Basel – 2004–07
 Dario Vidošić – Sion – 2013–15

Austria 
 Chukwubuike Adamu – St. Gallen – 2020–21
Moritz Bauer – Grasshopper, Servette FC – 2011–16, 2022-
 Daniel Beichler – St. Gallen – 2010–11
 Marco Djuricin – Grasshopper – 2017–19
 Aleksandar Dragović – Basel – 2010–14
 Daniel Dunst – St. Gallen – 2010–11
 Patrick Farkas – Luzern – 2021–
 Sandro Gotal – St. Gallen – 2015–16
Raphael Holzhauser – Grasshopper – 2018–19
Elvin Ibrisimovic – Vaduz – 2020–
 Marc Janko – Basel, Lugano – 2015–19
 Jakob Jantscher – Luzern – 2014–16
 Kurt Jara – Grasshopper – 1981–85
 Thomas Mandl – Basel – 2004–05
 Sanel Kuljić – Sion, Neuchâtel Xamax – 2006–07, 2009–11
 Markus Kuster – Winterthur – 2022–
 Marko Kvasina – Luzern – 2021–
 Mario Leitgeb – St. Gallen – 2015–17
Heinz Lindner – Grasshopper, Basel – 2017–19, 2020–
 Roland Linz – Grasshopper – 2008–09
 Georg Margreitter – Grasshopper – 2021–
 Emanuel Pogatetz – Aarau – 2002–03
 Thomas Prager – Luzern – 2010–11
Boris Prokopič – Vaduz – 2020–
 Mario Sara – Vaduz– 2014–15
 Louis Schaub – Luzern – 2020–21
 Thorsten Schick – Young Boys – 2016–19
 René Schicker – St. Gallen – 2004–05
 Fabian Schubert – St. Gallen – 2021–
 Daniel Sikorski – St. Gallen – 2014–15
 Manuel Sutter – St. Gallen, Vaduz – 2009–11, 2012–13, 2014–16
 Peter Tschernegg – St. Gallen – 2017–19
 Philipp Zulechner – Young Boys – 2015–16

Azerbaijan
Renat Dadashov – Grasshopper – 2022–

Bahrain 
 Abdulla Baba Fatadi – Neuchâtel Xamax – 2009–10
 Abdullah Omar – Neuchâtel Xamax – 2009–12

Belgium 
 Jérémy Huyghebaert – Neuchâtel Xamax – 2018–19
 Ilombe Mboyo – Sion – 2017–18
 Émile Mpenza – Sion – 2009–10
 Geoffrey Mujangi Bia – Sion – 2015–17
 Julien Ngoy – Grasshoppers – 2018–19

Benin 
Tosin Aiyegun – Zürich – 2019–
 Alain Gaspoz – St. Gallen, Sion, Lugano, Zürich, Aarau – 1992–93, 1995–2004, 2006–07
 Omar Kossoko – Servette – 2012–13
 Adam Waidi – FC Lausanne-Sport – 2012–14

Bolivia 
 Sergio Bastida – Lugano, Zürich, Aarau – 1999–2005, 2007–10
 Boris Céspedes – Servette – 2019–

Bosnia and Herzegovina 
 Admir Aganović – Neuchâtel Xamax – 2009–11 
 Amar Avdukić – Thun – 2017–18
 Mirsad Baljić – Sion, Zürich, Luzern – 1988–94
 Mehmed Begzadić – FC Lausanne-Sport – 2012–13
 Aleksandar Bratić – Servette – 2000–04
 Josip Colina – Basel, Grasshopper – 1998–99, 2007–11
 Miroslav Čovilo – Lugano – 2018–
Ermedin Demirović – St. Gallen – 2019–20
 Damir Džombić – Basel, Vaduz – 2003–04, 2005–07, 2008–09
 Omer Dzonlagic – Thun – 2015–18
 Izet Hajrović – Grasshopper – 2009–14
 Sead Hajrović – Grasshopper – 2013–14
 Amir Hamzić – Aarau – 2000–02
 Sanel Jahić – Grasshopper – 2013–15
Rifet Kapić – Grasshopper – 2017–18
Kenan Kodro – Grasshopper – 2017–18
 Muhamed Konjić – Zürich – 1996–97
 Davor Landeka – Grasshopper – 2011–12
 Senad Lulić – Grasshopper, Young Boys – 2008–11
 Danijel Milićević – Yverdon Sport – 2005–06
 Daniel Pavlović – Grasshopper, Lugano – 2010–15, 2019–
 Sejad Salihović – St. Gallen – 2016–17
 Admir Seferagić – Basel – 2013–14
 Mustafa Sejmenović – Yverdon-Sport – 2005–06
 Asim Škaljić – Sion – 2004–07
 Admir Smajić – Neuchâtel Xamax, Basel, Young Boys – 1988–99
 Leonid Srdic – Lugano – 2021–
 Miroslav Stevanović – Servette – 2019–
 Aldin Turkeš – Zürich, Vaduz, Lausanne-Sport – 2015–17, 2020–

Brazil 
 Abedi – Sion, Basel – 1998–2000
 Adaílton – Sion – 2009–13
 Felipe Adão – Luzern – 2007–08
 Adriano – Neuchâtel Xamax – 1992–95
 Adryan – Sion – 2017–19, 2021–
 Aislan – Sion – 2011–13
 Fabiano Alves – St. Gallen – 2019–20
 Lucas Alves de Araujo – Luzern – 2016–
 Sonny Anderson – Servette – 1992–94
 Assis – Sion – 1992–95, 1996–97
 Marco Balthazar – Servette – 2004–05
 Batata – Sion – 2018–
 Tiago Bernardini – Thun – 2005–06
 Bruno Bertucci – Grasshopper – 2011–12
 Beto – Sion – 2007–09
 Léo Bonatini – Grasshopper – 2021–
Arthur Cabral – Basel – 2019–22
 Caio Alves – Grasshopper – 2013–17
Caiuby – Grasshopper – 2018–19
 Tiago Calvano – Young Boys – 2005–08
 Carlão – Neuchâtel Xamax – 2011–12
 Carlinhos – Thun – 2016–17
Carlinhos Júnior – Lugano – 2016–20
 Carlitos – Aarau – 2006–08
 Cássio – Thun – 2012–15
 Mychell Chagas – Servette – 2019–
 Claiton – Servette – 2001–02
 Cristiano – Basel – 2006–07
 Matheus Cunha – Sion – 2017–18
 Antônio da Silva – Basel – 2009–10
 Ronny Carlos da Silva – Zürich – 2004–05
 Marcos De Azevedo – Servette – 2011–13
 Danilo de Oliveira – Sion – 2011–13
 Jão Carlos de Oliveira – Yverdon Sport – 2000–01
 Leonardo de Oliveira – Servette, St. Gallen – 2004–06
 Di Fábio – Thun – 2006–08
 Didi – Yverdon-Sport – 2000–01
 Dill – Servette – 2001–02
 Marcus Diniz – FC Lausanne-Sport – 2016–17
 Antonio Dos Santos – Thun, Schaffhausen, Grasshopper, Sion – 2003–10
 Edílson – Aarau – 2003–04
 Eduardo – Basel – 2005–09
 Enílton – Yverdon-Sport, Sion – 1999–2001
 Eudis – Zürich, Young Boys, Servette – 2006–09, 2011–13
 Everson – Young Boys, Neuchâtel Xamax – 2005–06, 2007–08
 Fabiano – Thun – 2011–12
 Fabinho – Delémont, Wil 1900, St. Gallen, Schaffhausen – 1999–2000, 2002–07
 Fernando – Schaffhausen, St. Gallen – 2004–08, 2009–11
 Leandro Fonseca – St. Gallen, Yverdon-Sport, Neuchâtel Xamax, Young Boys, Grasshopper, Thun – 1995–96, 1999–2000, 2001–04, 2005–07
 Galatto – Neuchâtel Xamax – 2011–12
 José Galvão – Servette – 2002–03
 Mauro Galvão – Lugano – 1990–96
 Gaspar – Lugano, Vaduz, Bellinzona – 2001–02, 2008–10
 Edson Gaúcho – FC Lausanne-Sport – 1988–89
 Gelson Rodrigues – Thun – 2004–06
 Gil Bala – Yverdon-Sport – 2000–01
 Franciel Hengemühle – Schaffhausen – 2004–05
 Hilton – Servette – 2002–04
 Itaitinga – Sion – 2018–
 Léo Itaperuna – Sion – 2012–17
 João Paulo – Servette, Young Boys, Neuchâtel Xamax – 2004–08
 Juárez – Yverdon-Sport, Servette – 1993–99
 Jefferson – Lugano – 2019–
 Kléber – Basel – 2004–05
 Christian Leite – Thun – 2014–15
 Patrick Luan – Sion – 2019–
 Luís Mário – St. Gallen – 2007–08
 Luis Phelipe – Lugano – 2021–
 Everton Luiz – St. Gallen – 2014–16
 Luiz Carlos – Sion – 2006–07
 Gabriel Machado – Grasshopper – 2007–08
 Marcão – Yverdon-Sport – 2005–06
 Marcos – Young Boys – 2006–07
 Marquinhos Cipriano – Sion – 2021–
Ryder Matos – Luzern – 2019–20
 Nathan Cardoso – Grasshopper, Zürich – 2018–
 Júnior Negrão – FC Lausanne-Sport – 2011–12
André Luís Neitzke – Sion, Neuchâtel Xamax – 2017–20
 Neri – St. Gallen, Young Boys, Aarau, Schaffhausen, Bellinzona – 1998–2000, 2004–07, 2008–09
 Weligton Oliveira – Grasshopper – 2006–07
 Paquito – Luzern – 2006–07, 2008–09
 Paulinho – Aarau, Grasshopper – 2003–12
Paulo Ricardo – Sion – 2016–18
 Pedro Henrique – Zürich – 2011–14
 Pena – Grasshopper – 1998–99
 Philippe – Sion – 2018–19
 Adriano Pimenta – Thun – 2005–07
 Raffael – Luzern – 2005–08
 Ramazotti – Zürich – 2011–12
Eric Ramires – Basel – 2019–20
 Rodrigo – Sion, FC Lausanne-Sport – 2010–13
 Rogério – Wil 1900, Grasshopper, Aarau – 2003–10
 Willian Rocha – Grasshopper – 2012–13
 Rosemir – Wil 1900, Schaffhausen – 2003–04, 2005–07
Raphael Rossi Branco – Sion – 2018–19
 Fabinho Santos – Basel – 1998–99
Guilherme Schettine – Grasshopper – 2022–
 Silas – Grasshopper – 2010–11 
 Adriano Spadoto – Thun – 2004–05 
 Túlio – Sion – 1992–93 
 Valmir – Wil 1900 – 2002–03
 Leandro Vieira – Thun – 2005–06
 Vinícius – Zürich – 2015–16
 Vítor Huvos – Grasshopper – 2007–09
 Wesley (David de Oliveira Andrade) – Sion – 2020–
 Wesley (Lopes da Silva) – Grasshopper – 2006–07
 Yuri – Lugano – 2021–

Bulgaria 
 Petar Aleksandrov – Aarau, Neuchâtel Xamax, Luzern – 1991–93, 1994–2000
 Alexandre Barthe – Grasshopper – 2015–16
 Valeri Bojinov – FC Lausanne-Sport – 2017–18
 Georgi Donkov – Neuchâtel Xamax – 2001–02
 Ivan Ivanov – Basel – 2013–15
 Borislav Mihaylov – Zürich – 1997–98
 Georgi Milanov – Grasshopper – 2015–16
 Martin Petrov – Servette – 1998–2001
 Dimitar Rangelov – Luzern – 2012–14
 Georgi Slavchev – St. Gallen – 1997–99
 Zlatomir Zagorčić – Lugano – 1999–2002

Burkina Faso 
Hassane Bandé – Thun – 2019–20
 Salifou Diarrassouba – St. Gallen – 2020–
 Nasser Djiga – Basel – 2021–

Burundi 

 David Opango – Zurich, Aarau – 1997–2007

Cameroon 
 Yvan Alounga – Luzern – 2020–
 Timothée Atouba – Neuchâtel Xamax, Basel – 2000–04
 Gustave Bahoken – Sion – 1998–99
 Albert Baning – Aarau – 2005–06
 Patrick Bengondo – Aarau – 2006–09
 Henri Bienvenu – Young Boys – 2009–12
 Vincent Bikana – Neuchâtel Xamax – 2011–12
 Gilles Binya – Neuchâtel Xamax – 2009–12
 Armand Deumi – Sion, Thun – 2000–07
 Patrick Ekeng – FC Lausanne-Sport – 2013–14
 Eugène Ekobo – Sion – 2000–02
 Franck Etoundi – Neuchâtel Xamax, St. Gallen, Zürich – 2009–10, 2012–16
 Guy Feutchine – St. Gallen – 2006–08
 Christ Mbondi – Sion – 2010–12
 Lucien Mettomo – Luzern – 2006–07
 Otele Mouangue – Luzern, Aarau – 2012–14
 Sylvain Moukwelle – Lugano – 2000–01
 Yannick N'Djeng – Sion – 2012–14
 Tsiy-William Ndenge – Luzern – 2018–
 Moumi Ngamaleu – Young Boys – 2017–
 Jean-Pierre Nsame – Young Boys – 2017–
 Samuel Ojong – Sion, Delémont, Neuchâtel Xamax, Thun – 2000–05
Gaël Ondoua – Servette – 2019–21
 Brice Owona – St. Gallen – 2009–12
 Edgar Salli – St. Gallen – 2015–16
Alex Song – Sion – 2018–20
 Jean-Pierre Tcheutchoua – Sion, Aarau – 2001–02, 2003–07
 Jean-Michel Tchouga – Yverdon-Sport, Basel, Luzern – 1999–2002, 2006–10
 Hervé Tum – Sion, Basel – 1998–99, 2000–04
 Banana Yaya – FC Lausanne-Sport – 2013–14
Christian Zock – Sion – 2017–20
 Jacques Zoua – Basel – 2009–13

Canada 
 Ian Bridge – La Chaux-de-Fonds – 1985–90
 Daniel Imhof – St. Gallen – 1999–2005, 2009–11
Liam Millar – Basel – 2021–
 Josh Simpson – Young Boys – 2011–12

Cape Verde 
Cabral – Basel, Zürich – 2007–13, 2015–17
Vagner – Sion – 2021–

Central African Republic 
 Frédéric Nimani – Neuchâtel Xamax – 2018–19

Chile 
 Mario Cáceres – St. Gallen – 2008–10
 Marcelo Díaz – Basel – 2012–15
 Bryan Rabello – Luzern – 2014–15
 Sebastián Rozental – Grasshopper – 2002–03
 Eduardo Rubio – Basel – 2008–09
 Héctor Tapia – Thun – 2006–07
 Adán Vergara – Zürich, Luzern – 2007–09
 Iván Zamorano – St. Gallen – 1988–90

China 
Lei Li – Grasshopper – 2021–

Colombia 
Éder Álvarez Balanta – Basel – 2016–20
 Álvaro Domínguez – Sion – 2007–11
 Jhon Espinoza – Lugano – 2022–
 Alexander Viveros – Grasshopper – 2005–06

Congo 
 Chris Malonga – FC Lausanne-Sport – 2012–13
 Matt Moussilou – FC Lausanne-Sport – 2011–14
 Igor N'Ganga – Young Boys, Aarau – 2006–08, 2013–15

Congo DR 
Chadrac Akolo – Sion, St Gallen – 2013–17, 2022-
Jonathan Bolingi – FC Lausanne-Sport – 2020–
Meschak Elia – Young Boys – 2019–
Timothy Fayulu – Sion – 2018–
Enes Fermino – Sion – 2008–11
Joël Kiassumbua – Lugano, Servette – 2017–18, 2019–
Mbala Mbuta Biscotte – Grasshopper – 2006–07
Christopher Mfuyi – Servette – 2012–13
Ridge Mobulu – Luzern – 2014–15
Ridge Munsy – Thun, Grasshopper – 2014–18
Shabani Nonda – Zürich – 1996–98
Jonathan Okita – Zürich – 2022–
Nzuzi Toko – Grasshopper, St. Gallen – 2008–14, 2016–18

Costa Rica 
Mayron George – FC Lausanne-Sport – 2021–
Álvaro Saborío – Sion – 2006–10
Yeltsin Tejeda – FC Lausanne-Sport – 2016–18

Croatia 
Marko Bašić – Grasshopper – 2015–19
Petar Brlek – Lugano – 2018–19
 Frane Čirjak – Luzern – 2015–16
Ante Ćorić – Zürich – 2021–22
 Antonini Čulina – Lugano – 2015–16, 2017–18
 Niko Datković – Lugano – 2015–16
 Tomislav Erceg – Lugano, Grasshopper – 1995–96
 Ilija Ivić – St. Gallen – 2012–13
 Jurica Jerković – Zürich, Lugano – 1978–86
 Vedran Ješe – Thun – 2006–07
Goran Jozinović – Lugano – 2015–18
Nikola Katić – Zürich – 2022–
Stjepan Kukuruzović – Zürich, Vaduz, St. Gallen – 2010–14, 2015–19
 Luka Lapenda – Grasshopper – 2007–08
Matej Maglica – St. Gallen – 2021–
 Ivan Marković – Thun – 2014–15, 2016–17
 Ivan Martić – St. Gallen, Sion – 2009–11, 2012–14, 2020–
 Stipe Matić – Zürich, Thun – 2003–04, 2010–13
 Frano Mlinar – Aarau – 2014–15
 Mladen Petrić – Grasshopper, Basel – 1999–2007
 Tomislav Puljić – Luzern – 2010–17
 Domagoj Pušić – Lugano – 2015–16
 Ivan Rakitić – Basel – 2005–07
 Kaja Rogulj – Luzern – 2014–16
Ivan Santini – Zürich – 2022–
Roko Šimić – Zürich – 2022–
 Petar Slišković – Aarau – 2014–15
 Marijan Urtić – Luzern – 2009–11
 Ante Vukušić – FC Lausanne-Sport – 2013–14

Curaçao 

Rangelo Janga – Lugano – 2019–20

Cyprus 
 Demetris Christofi – Sion 2013–15

Czech Republic 
 Jan Berger – Basel, Grasshopper, Bellinzona, St. Gallen – 1994–2003
 Erich Brabec – Aarau – 2006–07
 Daniel Břežný – Vaduz – 2008–09
 Lukáš Došek – Sion – 2006–08
 Martin Frýdek – Luzern – 2020–
 Martin Guzik – Zürich – 1997–98
 Radoslav Kováč – Basel – 2011–12
 Jiří Koubský – St. Gallen – 2005–08, 2009–10
 Jan Lecjaks – Young Boys – 2011–17
 Vratislav Lokvenc – Basel – 2007–08
Roman Macek – Lugano – 2018–
 Václav Němeček – Servette – 1995–97
 Pavel Pergl – Bellinzona, Vaduz – 2010–11, 2014–16
Tomáš Vaclík – Basel – 2014–18
Marek Suchý – Basel – 2013–19
 Martin Zeman – Sion – 2015–16

Denmark 
Lucas Andersen – Grasshopper – 2016–19
 John Eriksen – Servette, Luzern – 1986–91
Yones Felfel – Vaduz – 2016–17
Martin Hansen – Basel – 2018–19
 Daniel Høegh – Basel – 2015–17
 Emil Lyng – FC Lausanne-Sport – 2011–12
Andreas Maxsø – Zürich – 2018–19
 Peter Møller – Zürich – 1994–95
 Miklos Molnar – Servette – 1991–92
 Jens Odgaard – Lugano – 2020–21
 Patrick Olsen – Grasshopper – 2016–17
 Michael Silberbauer – Young Boys – 2011–13
 Frederik Sørensen – Young Boys – 2019–20
 Mark Strudal – Grasshopper – 1989–91
 Rasmus Thelander – Zürich – 2017–18
 Steen Thychosen – FC Lausanne-Sport – 1985–87
 Mads Valentin – Zürich – 2019–20

Dominican Republic 
 Heinz Barmettler – Zürich – 2006–12

Ecuador 
Felipe Caicedo – Basel – 2006–08
Leonardo Campana – Grasshopper – 2021–22
Jhon Espinoza – Lugano – 2022–

Egypt 
 Ahmed Hamoudi – Basel – 2014–16
 Essam El-Hadary – Sion – 2007–09
 Mohamed Elneny – Basel – 2012–16
 Omar Gaber – Basel – 2016–18
 Hossam Hassan – Neuchâtel Xamax – 1991–92
 Ibrahim Hassan – Neuchâtel Xamax – 1991–92
 Kahraba – Luzern, Grasshopper – 2013–15
 Ahmed Abdel Monem – Neuchâtel Xamax – 1999–2000
 Hany Ramzy – Neuchâtel Xamax – 1990–94
 Mohamed Salah – Basel – 2012–14

England 
 Mark Bright – Sion – 1996–97
 Archie Brown – FC Lausanne-Sport – 2021–
Trae Coyle – FC Lausanne-Sport – 2020–

Equatorial Guinea 
 Anatole Ngamukol – Thun, Grasshopper – 2012–15
 Pepín – Lugano – 2016–17

Estonia 
Karol Mets – Zürich – 2021–23

Ethiopia 
 Demssie Kenedy – Sion – 2000–01

Finland 
 Toni Kallio – Young Boys – 2007–08
 Veli Lampi – Zürich, Aarau – 2006–10
 Toni Lehtinen – Aarau – 2010–10
 Juho Mäkelä – St. Gallen, Thun – 2006–07, 2013–14
 Sakari Mattila – Bellinzona – 2010–11
 Juhani Ojala – Young Boys – 2011–13
 Berat Sadik – Thun – 2012–15
 Niklas Tarvajärvi – Neuchâtel Xamax – 2008–09
 Ville Taulo – Bellinzona – 2010–11
 Hannu Tihinen – Zürich – 2006–10

France 
Leroy Abanda – Neuchâtel Xamax – 2019–20
Fabrice Abriel – Servette – 2000–01
Aaron Akalé – Basel – 2022–
Jean-Kévin Augustin – Basel – 2022–
Axel Mohamed Bakayoko – St. Gallen – 2018–20
 Olivier Baudry (born 1970) – FC Aarau – 1999–2001
 Olivier Baudry (born 1973) – FC Lausanne-Sport – 2000–01
 Mathieu Béda – Zürich – 2010–13
 Stéphane Besle – Neuchâtel Xamax, St. Gallen – 2005–06, 2007–15
 Jason Buaillon – Sion – 2013–14
Sofyan Chader – Luzern – 2022–
 Ilyas Chouaref – Sion – 2022–
 Fousseyni Cissé – Sion – 2013–15
 Timothé Cognat – Servette – 2019–
 Mohamed Coulibaly – Grasshopper – 2011–13
 Enzo Crivelli – Servette – 2022–
Lucas Da Cunha – FC Lausanne-Sport – 2020–
 Issaga Diallo – Servette – 2011–13
Moussa Diallo – Servette – 2020–
Djibril Diani – Grasshopper – 2018–19
Andy Diouf – Basel – 2022–
 David Douline – Servette – 2021–
 Franck Durix – Servette – 1997–2000
 Fabrice Ehret – Aarau – 2005–06
 Mounir El Haimour – Yverdon-Sport, Schaffhausen, Neuchâtel Xamax – 2005–08
Tiago Escorza – FC Lausanne-Sport – 2017–18
 Hugo Fargues – Servette – 2011–12
 Bertrand Fayolle – Sion – 2000–01
Enzo Fernández – FC Lausanne-Sport – 2017–18
 Jean-Marc Ferreri – Zürich – 1997–98
 Boubacar Fofana – Servette – 2020–
 Florent – St. Gallen – 2015–16
 Yassin Fortuné – Sion – 2018–20
 Patrice Garande – Chênois – 1979–80
 Willem Geubbels – St. Gallen – 2022–
Anthony Goelzer – Grasshopper – 2018–19
Hakim Guenouche – Zürich – 2018–19
Evann Guessand – FC Lausanne-Sport – 2020–
 Éric Hassli – Neuchâtel Xamax, Servette, St. Gallen, Zürich – 2003–06, 2007–11
 David Hellebuyck – FC Lausanne-Sport – 2000–01
 Fabrice Henry – Basel – 1997–2000
Guillaume Hoarau – Young Boys – 2014–20
 Julien Ielsch – Neuchâtel Xamax – 2004–05
Aldo Kalulu – Basel – 2018–19, 2020–
Wilfried Kanga – Young Boys – 2021–
Maxen Kapo – FC Lausanne-Sport – 2021–
 Christian Karembeu – Servette – 2004–05
 Billy Ketkeophomphone – Sion – 2011–12
Jared Khasa – Sion – 2018–
Goduine Koyalipou – FC Lausanne-Sport – 2021–
Grejohn Kyei – Servette – 2019–
 Yohan Lachor – Servette – 2000–01
 Jean-Paul Laufenburger – Basel – 1964–74
William Le Pogam – Neuchâtel Xamax – 2018–19
Jordan Lefort – Young Boys – 2019–
 Matthias Lepiller – Grasshopper – 2008–09
Yannis Letard – St. Gallen – 2019–2021
Alexandre Letellier – Young Boys – 2017–18
 Peter Luccin – FC Lausanne-Sport – 2011–12
Nasser Daoudou M'Sa – Sion – 2018–
 Franck Madou – Young Boys, Grasshopper – 2006–08
Hicham Mahou – FC Lausanne-Sport – 2020–
Anthony Maisonnial – Sion – 2018–19
Mathieu Manset – Sion – 2012–13
François Marque – Basel – 2007–10
Alexis Martial – Servette – 2019–
Malaury Martin – FC Lausanne-Sport – 2012–13
Matteo Mazzolini – Servette – 2019–
Olivier Monterrubio – Sion – 2008–09
Kévin Monzialo – Lugano – 2020–
Marko Muslin – FC Lausanne-Sport – 2011–12
Gaël N'Lundulu – FC Lausanne-Sport – 2011–12
Edmond N'Tiamoah – Basel, Luzern – 1999–2001, 2006–07
Ange Nanizayamo – FC Lausanne-Sport – 2020–
Noha Ndombasi – St. Gallen – 2022–
Andy Pelmard – Basel – 2021–
Norman Peyretti – Thun – 2015–18
Damien Plessis – FC Lausanne-Sport – 2013–14
Denis-Will Poha – Sion – 2022–
Maxime Poundjé – FC Lausanne-Sport – 2021–
Yoric Ravet – FC Lausanne-Sport, Grasshopper, Young Boys – 2013–18
Virgile Reset – Sion – 2006–09
Ronny Rodelin – Servette – 2021–
Christopher Routis – Servette – 2011–13
Jean Ruiz – Sion – 2019–
Nathanaël Saintini – Sion – 2021–
Mathieu Salamand – Thun – 2010–14
Vincent Sasso – Servette – 2019–
Grégory Sertic – Zürich – 2018–19
 Yoan Severin – Servette – 2019–
 Nsana Simon – St. Gallen – 2020–
 Anthony Sirufo – Sion – 2000–01
 Johnny Szlykowicz – Neuchâtel Xamax – 2006–08
 Jérôme Sonnerat – Servette, FC Lausanne-Sport – 2001–02, 2003–04, 2011–14
 Rayan Souici – Servette – 2019–
 Kevin Tapoko – FC Lausanne-Sport – 2012–13
 Jérémy Taravel – Sion – 2016–17
 Didier Tholot – Sion, Basel, Young Boys – 1997–2002
 Damien Tixier – Neuchâtel Xamax – 2008–10
 Xavier Tomas – FC Lausanne-Sport – 2016–17
 Geoffrey Tréand – Neuchâtel Xamax, Sion, Servette, St. Gallen – 2010–16
Adrien Trebel – FC Lausanne-Sport – 2021–
Theo Valls – Servette – 2020–
Hugo Vogel – Basel – 2022–
 Karim Yoda – Sion – 2009–13
 Élie Youan – St. Gallen – 2020–
 Sebahattin Yoksuzoglu – FC Lausanne-Sport, Yverdon-Sport – 2000–02, 2005–06

Gabon 
Yrondu Musavu-King – St. Gallen – 2017–18

Gambia 
Assan Ceesay – Lugano, Zürich – 2016–22
Abdou Rahman Dampha – Neuchâtel Xamax – 2009–12
Pa Modou Jagne – St. Gallen, Sion, Zürich – 2009–11, 2012–20
Saidy Janko – Young Boys – 2019–20

Georgia 
Vladimir Akhalaia – Zürich – 2005–06
Irakli Chirikashvili – Neuchâtel Xamax – 2011–12
Valerian Gvilia – Luzern – 2017–19
Gocha Jamarauli – Zürich, Luzern – 1998–2002
Otar Kakabadze – Luzern – 2018–21
Mikheil Kavelashvili – Grasshopper, Zürich, Luzern, Sion, Aarau, Basel – 1997–2004, 2005–07
Levan Kharabadze – Zürich – 2018–20
Levan Khomeriki – Aarau – 2000–02

Germany 
 Soheil Arghandewall – Zürich – 2019–
Holger Badstuber – Luzern – 2021–22
 Matthias Baron – Basel – 2010–11
 Felix Bastians – Young Boys – 2008–09
 Helmut Benthaus – Basel – 1965–71
 Peter Bernauer – Basel – 1987–91
 Axel Borgmann – Vaduz – 2015–17
 Jordan Brown – Zürich – 2014–15
 Lucas Cueto – St. Gallen – 2015–17
Leon Dajaku – St. Gallen – 2022–
Pius Dorn – Vaduz, Luzern – 2020–2021, 2022–
 Norbert Eder – Zürich – 1988–89
 Clemens Fandrich – Luzern – 2015–16
 Gianluca Gaudino – St. Gallen – 2015–17
 Maurizio Gaudino – Basel – 1997–98
Christian Gentner – Luzern – 2021–
Akaki Gogia – Zürich – 2021–
Lukas Görtler – St. Gallen – 2019–
 Tim Grossklaus – Vaduz – 2008–09
 Helmut Hauser – Basel – 1964–72
 Thomas Hauser – Basel – 1982–88
 Marc Hornschuh – Zürich – 2021–
 Gianluca Hossmann – Grasshopper – 2010–11, 2012–13, 2014–15
Nico Hug – Vaduz – 2020–
Moritz Jenz – FC Lausanne-Sport – 2020–
Anton Kade – Basel – 2022–
 Steffen Karl – Sion – 1994–95
Noah Katterbach – Basel – 2021–
 Francis Kioyo – Aarau – 2009–10
 Ludwig Kögl – Luzern – 1996–99
 Friedhelm Konietzka – Winterthur – 1967–71
Thomas Konrad – Vaduz – 2016–18
 Oliver Kreuzer – Basel – 1997–2002
 Moritz Leitner – Zürich – 2021–
Lars Lukas Mai – Lugano – 2022–
Max Meyer – Basel – 2022–
 Joy-Slayd Mickels – Aarau – 2014–15
 Dieter Müller – Grasshopper – 1985–96
 Marius Müller – Luzern – 2019–
 Leonhard Münst – St. Gallen – 2021–
 Günter Netzer – Grasshopper – 1976–77
 Oliver Neuville – Servette – 1992–96
 Tobias Nickenig – Vaduz – 2008–09
Patrick Pflücke – Servette – 2022–
 Nick Proschwitz – Thun – 2010–11
 Sreto Ristić – Grasshopper – 2006–07
 Alessandro Riedle – Grasshopper – 2008–09, 2010–11
 Karl-Heinz Rummenigge – Servette – 1987–89
 Sebastian Schachten – Luzern – 2015–16
Kofi Schulz – St. Gallen – 2016–17
 Marvin Schulz – Luzern – 2017–
 Markus Schupp – Basel – 1996–97
 Sahr Senesie – Grasshopper – 2004–05
Meritan Shabani – Grasshopper – 2022–
 Lasse Sobiech – Zürich – 2020–21
 Markus Steinhöfer – Basel – 2010–13
 Martin Stoll – Aarau – 2009–10
 Matthias Strohmaier – Vaduz – 2016–17
 Klaus Stürmer – Zürich, Grenchen – 1962–64, 1965–70
 Ifet Taljević – Neuchâtel Xamax, Thun – 2008–12
Varol Tasar – Servette – 2019–
 Lars Unnerstall – Aarau – 2013–14
Erwin Waldner – Zürich – 1960–61
 Thomas Weller – Schaffhausen, St. Gallen – 2005–08
 Stefan Wessels – Basel – 2009–10
 Christian Wieczorek – Vaduz – 2006–08
 Samed Yeşil – Luzern – 2015–16

Ghana 
Daniel Afriyie – Zürich – 2022–
 Samuel Afum – Young Boys – 2012–16
 Kwabena Agouda – St. Gallen – 2004–06, 2007–08
 Samul Alabi – Luzern – 2020–21
 Charles Amoah – Winterthur, Wil 1900, St. Gallen – 1996–97, 1998–2001
 Joetex Asamoah Frimpong – Young Boys, Luzern, Zürich – 2006–10, 2012–13
Majeed Ashimeru – St. Gallen – 2018–19
 Ebenezer Assifuah – Sion – 2013–17
Lawrence Ati-Zigi – St. Gallen – 2019–
 Owusu Benson – Kriens, Delémont – 1997–99, 2002–03
Raphael Dwamena – Zürich – 2017–18
 Mark Edusei – Bellinzona – 2009–11
 Samuel Inkoom – Basel – 2009–11
 Kasim Nuhu – Young Boys, Basel – 2016–18, 2022–
Musah Nuhu – St. Gallen – 2018–
 Alex Tachie-Mensah – Neuchâtel Xamax, St. Gallen – 2000–08
Ransford Selasi – Lugano – 2019–20
 Ishmael Yartey – Sion – 2011–12, 2013–15

Greece 
 Konstantinos Dimitriou – Basel – 2019–20
 Anastasios Donis – Lugano – 2015–16
 Christos Donis – Lugano – 2015–16
 Theofanis Gekas – Sion – 2015–17
 Thodoris Karapetsas – Grasshopper – 2008–09

Guadeloupe 
 Alexandre Alphonse – Zürich – 2006–12
 Anthony Baron – Servette – 2022–
 Dimitri Cavaré – Sion – 2019–
 Michaël Niçoise – Neuchâtel Xamax – 2007–09

Guinea 
 Thierno Bah – Servette, Neuchâtel Xamax, FC Lausanne-Sport – 1999–2004, 2007–10, 2011–12
 Mohamed Ali Camara – Young Boys – 2018–
Cheick Conde – Zürich – 2022–
 Kévin Constant – Sion – 2016–18
 Samba Lélé Diba – Servette – 2022–
 Pascal Feindouno – Sion, FC Lausanne-Sport – 2011–12, 2013–14
Daouda Guindo – St. Gallen – 2022–
 Alhassane Keita – Zürich, St. Gallen – 2001–07, 2013–14
 Kamil Zayatte – Young Boys – 2006–09

Guinea-Bissau 
Eliseu Cassamá – Grasshopper – 2022–
Papu Mendes – Servette – 2021–
Mauro Rodrigues – Sion – 2020–

Haiti 
 Frantz Bertin – Luzern – 2008–09
 Kim Jaggy – Grasshopper, Aarau – 1999–2007, 2013–15

Hungary 
Bendegúz Bolla – Grasshopper – 2021–
Filip Holender – Lugano – 2019–20
Ákos Kecskés – Lugano – 2018–21
Gábor Nagy – Aarau – 2007–08
Krisztián Vadócz – Grasshopper – 2014–15
Vilmos Vanczák – Sion – 2007–16
Kevin Varga – Young Boys – 2021–
Bálint Vécsei – Lugano – 2016–20
Ádám Szalai – Basel – 2021–

Iceland 
 Birkir Bjarnason – Basel – 2015–17
 Gunnleifur Gunnleifsson – Vaduz – 2008–09
Victor Pálsson – Zürich – 2017–19
Rúnar Már Sigurjónsson – Grasshopper, St. Gallen – 2016–19
 Guðmundur Steinarsson – Vaduz – 2008–09
 Grétar Steinsson – Young Boys – 2004–06

Iran 
 Daniel Davari – Grasshopper – 2014–15
 Farzad Ghadamian – Aarau – 1991

Iraq 
Sherko Karim – Grasshopper – 2015–17

Israel 
 Mu'nas Dabbur – Grasshopper – 2013–17
 Ohad Kadousi – FC Lausanne-Sport – 2013–14
 Nisso Kapiloto – St. Gallen – 2014–15
 Moshe Ohayon – Luzern – 2011–12
 Avi Rikan – Zürich 2013–15
 Ofir Mizrahi – Lugano – 2016–17
 Avi Tikva – Grasshopper, Young Boys – 1997–2000, 2001–03
 Lotem Zino – Thun – 2015–16

Italy 
Marco Ambrosio – Grasshopper – 2004–05
Giuseppe Aquaro – Aarau – 2008–10
Robert Acquafresca – Sion – 2017–19
Mario Balotelli – Sion – 2022–
Luigi Beghetto – Bellinzona – 2008–09
Davide Belotti – Bellinzona – 2008–09
Lorenzo Bucchi – Bellinzona, Grasshopper, Luzern – 2008–10, 2013–16
Riccardo Calafiori – Basel – 2022–
Paolo Carbone – Bellinzona – 2009–10
Alessandro Casciato – Lugano – 2021–
Tommaso Centinaro – Lugano – 2020–
Maurizio Ciaramitaro – Bellinzona – 2009–10
Matteo Cinquini – Lugano – 2021–
Luca Clemenza – Sion – 2020–21
Andrea Conti – Bellinzona – 2008–11
Piero Constantino – Yverdon-Sport – 2000–01
Franco Cucinotta – FC Lausanne-Sport, Sion, Zürich, Chiasso, Servette – 1960–75
Nicola Dalmonte – Lugano – 2019–20
Giorgio Del Signore – Zürich – 1998–2001
Roberto Di Matteo – Aarau – 1992–93
Aimo Diana – Bellinzona – 2009–11
Federico Dimarco – Sion – 2017–18
Sebastiano Esposito – Basel – 2021–22
Luca Ferro – Neuchâtel Xamax – 2008–11
Paolo Frascatore – FC Lausanne-Sport – 2016–17
Gennaro Gattuso – Sion – 2012–13
Guerino Gottardi – Neuchâtel Xamax – 1992–93
Wilfried Gnonto – Zürich – 2020–23
Demetrio Greco – Aarau – 2006–07
Matteo Gritti – Young Boys, Bellinzona – 2006–07, 2008–11
Andrea Guatelli – Zürich – 2007–12
Iacopo La Rocca – Bellinzona, Grasshopper – 2008–12
Cristian Daniel Ledesma – Lugano – 2017–18
Feliciano Magro – Grasshopper, Basel, Zürich – 1997–2002, 2003–04, 2008–09
Andrea Maccoppi – FC Lausanne-Sport, Servette – 2016–18, 2019–20
Carlo Manicone – Lugano – 2017–18
Francesco Margiotta – FC Lausanne-Sport, Luzern – 2016–18, 2019–20
Rosario Martinelli – Zürich, Chiasso – 1961–77
Edoardo Masciangelo – Lugano – 2018–19
Maurizio Melina – Luzern – 1992–96
Giuseppe Miccolis – Bellinzona – 2008–09
Ludovico Moresi – Lugano – 1999–2002
Stefano Nava – Servette – 1996–97
Raoul Petretta – Basel – 2016–22
Mario Piccinocchi – Lugano – 2015–19
Luca Radice – Aarau – 2013–15
Jacopo Ravasi – Luzern – 2008–09
Stefano Razzetti – Lugano, St. Gallen – 1999–2002, 2003–08
Vincenzo Rennella – Grasshopper – 2009–11
Daniele Romano – Aarau – 2013–14
Lorenzo Rosseti – Lugano – 2016–17
Fausto Rossini – Bellinzona – 2009–10
Francesco Russo – Lugano – 2015–17
Andrea Russotto – Bellinzona – 2009–10
Luca Saudati – Lugano – 1996–97
Enrico Schirinzi – Luzern, Thun – 2008–09, 2010–17
 Marco Tardelli – St. Gallen – 1987–88
 Orlando Urbano – Lugano – 2015–17
 Carlo Zotti – Bellinzona – 2008–11

Ivory Coast 
 Kanga Akalé – Sion, Zürich – 1998–2003
 Roger Assalé – Young Boys – 2016–20
 Chris Bedia – Servette – 2022-
 Arthur Boka – Sion – 2016–17
 Willie Britto – Zürich – 2019–
 Eugène Dadi – Vaduz – 2008–09
 Souleymane Diaby – Winterthur – 2022–
 Mohammed Diallo – Sion – 2006–07
 Serey Dié – Basel, Neuchâtel Xamax, Sion – 2012–15, 2016–
 Kouadio Pascal Doubaï – Young Boys – 2010–13
 Thierry Doubaï – Young Boys, Luzern – 2007–08, 2009–11, 2014–16
 Ousmane Doumbia – Zürich – 2020–
 Seydou Doumbia – Basel – 2016–17
Souleyman Doumbia – Grasshopper – 2017–18
 Abraham Gneki Guié – FC Lausanne-Sport – 2012–13
 Gerard Gohou – Neuchâtel Xamax – 2009–11
 Steve Gohouri – Yverdon-Sport, Young Boys – 2000–01, 2005–07
Kader Keïta – Sion – 2021–
 Yao Eloge Koffi – Lugano – 2017–20
 Axel Cédric Konan – Bellinzona – 2010–11
Hamed Koné – Neuchâtel Xamax – 2018–19
 Koro Koné – Servette – 2019–
 Lamine Koné – FC Lausanne-Sport – 2021–
 Xavier Kouassi – Servette, Sion, Neuchâtel Xamax– 2011–16, 2017–20
 Emmanuel Latte Lath – St. Gallen – 2022–
 Hassan Lingani – Young Boys – 2009–13
 Yacoub Meite – Sion – 2010–11
 Jean N'Guessan – FC Lausanne-Sport – 2021–
 Ahmed Ouattara – Sion, Basel – 1994–99
 Brahima Ouattara – FC Lausanne-Sport – 2020–
Sékou Sanogo – Thun, Grasshopper, Young Boys – 2010–19
Giovanni Sio – Sion, Basel – 2010–12, 2013–15, 2021–
Trazié Thomas – FC Lausanne-Sport – 2020–
Eric Tia – Luzern – 2019–
 Adama Traoré – Basel – 2014–17
 Youssouf Traoré – Young Boys – 2008–10
 Gilles Yapi Yapo – Young Boys, Basel, Zürich – 2005–13, 2014–16
 Armel Zohouri – FC Lausanne-Sport – 2020–

Japan 
 Teruki Hara – Grasshopper – 2022–
 Nikki Havenaar – Thun – 2019–20
 Naoki Imaya – Neuchâtel Xamax – 2003–04
 Yoichiro Kakitani – Basel – 2014–16
 Hayao Kawabe – Grasshopper – 2021–
 Yuya Kubo – Young Boys – 2013–17
 Yoshika Matsubara – Delémont – 1999–2000
 Kōji Nakata – Basel – 2005–08
 Ayumu Seko – Grasshopper – 2021–
Toichi Suzuki – FC Lausanne-Sport – 2020–
 Yamato Wakatsuki – Sion – 2019–

Kazakhstan 
 Alexander Merkel – Grasshopper – 2014–15

Kosovo 
Eris Abedini – Winterthur – 2022–
Kemal Ademi – Neuchâtel Xamax, Basel – 2018–20
Alban Ajdini– Servette – 2019–
Ifraim Alija – Wil 1900 – 2003–04
Fidan Aliti – Luzern, Zürich – 2013–15, 2020–
Donis Avdijaj – Zürich – 2022–
Ismajl Beka – Luzern – 2022–
Uran Bislimi – Lugano – 2022–
Mërgim Brahimi – Grasshopper, Aarau – 2011–14, 2015–18
Albert Bunjaku – Schaffhausen, St. Gallen – 2004–06, 2014–17
Imran Bunjaku – Grasshopper – 2013–14
Dugagjin Dedaj – Zürich – 2010–11
Shkelqim Demhasaj – Luzern – 2017–20
David Domgjoni – Luzern – 2021–
Toni Domgjoni – Zürich – 2017–21
Lorik Emini – Luzern – 2019–
Betim Fazliji – St. Gallen – 2019–
Dren Feka – Luzern – 2017–19
Florent Hadergjonaj – Young Boys – 2013–17
Kreshnik Hajrizi – Lugano – 2021–
Kevin Halabaku – Sion – 2022–
Florian Hoxha – Zürich – 2021–
Florian Hysenaj – FC Lausanne-Sport – 2020–
Arian Kabashi – Sion – 2019–
Arbenit Xhemajli – Neuchâtel Xamax – 2018–20
Benjamin Kololli – Sion, Young Boys, FC Lausanne-Sport, Zürich – 2012–14, 2015–
Jetmir Krasniqi – Lugano – 2017–18
Hekuran Kryeziu – Luzern, Vaduz, Zürich – 2010–
Leotrim Kryeziu – Lugano – 2018–
Mirlind Kryeziu – Zürich – 2017–
Denis Markaj – Lugano – 2015–16
Mark Marleku – Luzern – 2019–
Gezim Pepsi – Lugano – 2022–
Alban Pnishi – Grasshopper – 2015–18
Jozef Pukaj – Winterthur – 2022–
Dilan Qela – Neuchâtel Xamax – 2018–19
Fuad Rahimi – Vaduz – 2020–
Samir Ramizi – Servette – 2012–13
Lavdrim Rexhepi – Zürich – 2017–18, 2019–
Donat Rrudhani – Young Boys – 2022–
Enit Sadiku – Zürich – 2019–20
Zenun Selimi – Luzern, Delémont – 2000–03
Gjelbrim Taipi – St. Gallen, Grasshoppers – 2017–
Idriz Voca – Luzern – 2016–21
Skender Zeqiri – Aarau – 2008–10
Edon Zhegrova – Basel – 2018–22

Latvia 
 Nauris Bulvītis – Aarau – 2013–14
 Edgars Gauračs – Aarau – 2014–15
Mārcis Ošs – Neuchâtel Xamax – 2018–20
 Igors Stepanovs – Grasshopper – 2004–06
Andris Vaņins – Sion, Zürich – 2009–16, 2017–
Roberts Uldriķis – Sion – 2018–

Liberia 
 Josephus Yenay – Yverdon-Sport, Sion, Luzern – 1993–98

Liechtenstein 
Benjamin Büchel – Vaduz – 2020–
 Franz Burgmeier – Aarau, Basel, Thun, Vaduz – 2005–08
 Mario Frick – St. Gallen, Basel, Zürich, Grasshopper – 1994–2000, 2009–11
Maximilian Göppel – Vaduz – 2016–17
 Nicolas Hasler – Vaduz, Thun – 2014–17, 2019–20
 Rainer Hasler – Grasshopper, Vaduz, Neuchâtel Xamax, Servette – 1976–89
 Peter Jehle – Grasshopper, Luzern, Vaduz – 2000–06, 2012–13, 2014–17
 Daniel Kaufmann – Vaduz – 2014–16
 Yves Oehri – St. Gallen – 2009–10
Justin Ospelt – Vaduz – 2020–
 Michele Polverino – Vaduz, Aarau – 2008–10, 2014–15
Dennis Salanović – Thun – 2018–20
 Sandro Wieser – Basel, Aarau, Thun – 2010–12, 2014–16

Luxembourg 
 Stéphane Gillet – Wil 1900 – 2003–04
 Christopher Martins – Young Boys – 2019–
 Mario Mutsch – Aarau, Sion, St. Gallen – 2007–09, 2011–17
 Jeff Saibene – Aarau – 1990–91
 Jeff Strasser – Grasshopper – 2009–10

Macedonia 
 Ezgjan Alioski – Lugano – 2015–17
 Muhamed Demiri – Thun, St. Gallen – 2010–15
 Gilson – Yverdon-Sport – 2000–01
 Nikola Gjorgjev – Grasshopper – 2014–17
 Boško Gjurovski – Servette – 1989–95
 Adis Jahović – Zürich – 2012–13
 Mirsad Mijadinoski – Zürich, Sion – 1999–2000, 2006–08
 Nebi Mustafi – Neuchâtel Xamax – 2005–06
 Ilija Najdoski – Sion – 1996–97
 Aco Stojkov – Aarau – 2009–10
Dejan Stojanović – St. Gallen – 2016–20
 Skumbim Sulejmani – Luzern – 2006–07

Mali 
 Ousmane Diakité – St. Gallen – 2021–
Mamady Diambou – Luzern – 2022–
 Drissa Diarra – Bellinzona – 2008–11
 Daouda Guindo – St. Gallen – 2022–
Aly Mallé – Grasshopper – 2018–19
 Alhassane Touré – Schaffhausen – 2003–04

Mauritania 
 Sally Sarr – Luzern – 2011–17

Mexico 
 Aarón Galindo – Grasshopper – 2006–07

Moldova 
 Serghei Alexeev – Aarau – 2009–10
 Artur Ioniță – Aarau – 2009–10, 2013–14
Nicolae Milinceanu – Vaduz – 2020–

Montenegro 
 Miloš Bakrač – Sion – 2013–14
 Duško Đurišić – Sion – 2001–02
 Asmir Kajević – Zürich – 2011–15
 Ivan Kecojević – Zürich – 2013–18
 Samel Šabanović – Grasshopper – 2008–10
 Đorđe Šušnjar – Lugano – 2015–16
 Anes Zverotić – Wil 1900 – 2013–14
Elsad Zverotić – Luzern, Young Boys, Sion – 2008–18

Morocco 
Sofiane Alakouch – FC Lausanne-Sport – 2021–
 Jamal Alioui – Sion – 2006–10
 Chahir Belghazouani – Neuchâtel Xamax – 2008–09
Younes Bnou Marzouk – Lugano – 2017–18
 Samir Boughanem – Neuchâtel Xamax – 1997–2000
Fouad Chafik – FC Lausanne-Sport – 2021–
 Abdelouahed Chakhsi – FC Lausanne-Sport – 2011–14
 Tariq Chihab – Zürich, Grasshopper, Sion, Neuchâtel Xamax – 2000–10
 Faysal El Idrissi – Luzern – 2005–06
Hicham Kanis – Sion – 2017–18
 Salahiddine Khlifi – Neuchâtel Xamax – 2002–03
Mimoun Mahi – Zürich – 2019–20
 Ali Messaoud – Vaduz – 2015–17
 Ayoub Rachane – Luzern – 2007–08

Mozambique 
 Paíto – Sion, Neuchâtel Xamax – 2007–12

Netherlands 
 Tim Bakens – St. Gallen – 2010–12
Wouter Burger – Basel – 2021–
 Sandro Calabro – St. Gallen – 2010–12
 Wilco Hellinga – St. Gallen, Zürich – 1995–2003
 Jean-Paul Boëtius – Basel – 2015–17
 Daniël de Ridder – Grasshopper – 2011–12
 Michael Dingsdag – Sion, Grasshopper – 2010–15
 Sander Keller – Neuchâtel Xamax – 2010–11
 Kristian Kuzmanović – Vaduz – 2014–15
 Erik Regtop – St. Gallen – 1996–98
 Alex Schalk – Servette – 2019–
 René van der Gijp – Neuchâtel Xamax, Aarau – 1987–89
 René van Eck – Luzern – 1990–98
 Michel van Oostrum – Old Boys – 1989–90
 Ricky van Wolfswinkel – Basel – 2017–
 Eric Viscaal – Grasshopper – 1995–96

New Zealand 
 Marco Rojas – Thun – 2014–16
 Wynton Rufer – Zürich, Aarau, Grasshopper – 1982–89

Nigeria 
 Saidu Adeshina – Sion – 2007–11
 Benedict Akwuegbu – St. Gallen – 2004–05
Stanley Amuzie – Lugano – 2017–19
 Efan Ekoku – Grasshopper – 1999–2001
 Henry Ekubo – St. Gallen – 1999–2000, 2003–04
 Blessing Eleke – Luzern – 2018–20
 Alfred Emuejeraye – Grasshopper – 2003–04
 Brown Ideye – Neuchâtel Xamax – 2007–09
 Ikechukwu Kalu – Bellinzona – 2008–10
 Olarenwaju Kayode – Luzern – 2011–12
 Adekunle Lukmon – Luzern – 2008–13
Ifeanyi Mathew – Zürich – 2022–
 Yusuf Mohamed – Sion – 2009–10
Francis Momoh – Zürich – 2021–
 Obinna Nwaneri – Sion – 2007–10
Stephen Odey – Zürich – 2017–19
 Lucky Opara – Lugano – 2020–
 Wilson Oruma – Servette – 2000–02
 Sebastian Osigwe – Lugano – 2020–
Franklin Sasere – Lugano – 2019–
 Ike Shorunmu – Basel, Zürich, Luzern – 1995–99, 2001–02
 Taye Taiwo – FC Lausanne-Sport – 2016–17
 Kalu Uche – Neuchâtel Xamax – 2011–12
 Adewale Wahab – Bellinzona – 2008–11
 Rashidi Yekini – Zürich – 1997–98

North Korea 
 Jong Il-gwan – Luzern – 2017–18
 Pak Kwang-ryong – Basel, Vaduz, FC Lausanne-Sport – 2011–12, 2013–15, 2016–17

Northern Ireland 
 Kyle Lafferty – Sion – 2012–13

Norway 
 Mohamed Elyounoussi – Basel – 2016–18
Per-Egil Flo – FC Lausanne-Sport – 2020–
Ole Selnæs - FC Zurich - 2022-
Rafik Zekhnini – FC Lausanne-Sport – 2020–

Palestine 
 Saleh Chihadeh – Thun – 2019–

Panama 
 Gabriel Torres – FC Lausanne-Sport – 2016–18

Paraguay 
 Omar Alderete – Basel – 2019–
 Raúl Bobadilla – Grasshopper, Young Boys, Basel – 2007–09, 2011–14
 Mauro Caballero – Vaduz – 2015–16
 Derlis González – Basel – 2014–15
 Iván Emmanuel González – St. Gallen – 2004–05
 Darío Lezcano – Thun, Luzern – 2010–16
 Blás Riveros – Basel – 2016–

Peru 
 Rinaldo Cruzado – Grasshopper – 2007–08
 Roberto Merino – Servette – 2004–05
Jean-Pierre Rhyner – Grasshopper – 2016–19
Manuel Rivera Garrido – Bellinzona – 2008–11
Alexander Succar – Sion – 2017–18
 Carlos Zambrano – Basel – 2018–

Philippines 
 Martin Steuble – Neuchâtel Xamax, Grasshopper – 2008–10

Poland 
 Daniel Dziwniel – St. Gallen – 2014–15
 Radosław Gilewicz – St. Gallen – 1993–95
 Kamil Grosicki – Sion – 2007–08
 Ryszard Komornicki – Aarau – 1989–94
 Cezary Kucharski – Aarau – 1993–95
 Marek Leśniak – Neuchâtel Xamax – 1996–97
 Tomasz Rząsa – Grasshopper, Lugano, Young Boys – 1995–97
 Mirosław Trzeciak – Young Boys – 1994–95
 Zbigniew Zakrzewski – Sion, Thun – 2007–08

Portugal 
Asumah Abubakar – Lugano – 2020–
Barroca – Servette, FC Lausanne-Sport – 2011–14
Nelson Borges – FC Lausanne-Sport – 2011–12
Pedro Brazão – FC Lausanne-Sport – 2020–
Euclides Cabral – Grasshopper – 2018–19
Luís Calapes – Basel, Neuchâtel Xamax, Luzern, Thun – 1996–2001, 2006–08
Angelo Campos – St. Gallen – 2018–
Gonçalo Cardoso – Basel – 2020–
Carlitos – Basel, Sion – 2007–10, 2014–17
Carlos Manuel – Sion – 1987–88
Ricardo Costa – Luzern – 2016–17
Ambrosio Da Costa – Sion – 2016–17
Nuno da Silva – Thun – 2017–19
Joelson Fernandes – Basel – 2021–
Nelson Ferreira – Thun, Luzern – 2002–19
José Gonçalves – Thun, St. Gallen, Sion – 2005–06, 2010–13
João Paiva – Luzern, Grasshopper – 2007–13
João Pinto – Sion – 2006–07
Bruno Jordão – Grasshopper – 2021–
Fausto Lourenço – Neuchâtel Xamax – 2010–11
André Marques – Sion – 2012–14
Andre Filipe Martins Roque – Neuchâtel Xamax – 2000–02
Sava Miladinovic Bento – Luzern – 2010–11, 2013–15
Roderick Miranda – Servette – 2011–12
Diogo Monteiro – Servette – 2020–
Elton Monteiro – FC Lausanne-Sport – 2016–18, 2020–
Joel Monteiro – FC Lausanne-Sport – 2020–
André Moreira – Grasshopper – 2021–
Thierry Moutinho – Servette – 2011–13
Luís Pimenta – FC Lausanne-Sport – 2013–14
Roberto Pinto – Grasshopper – 2006–07
André Ribeiro – St. Gallen – 2019–
Ayrton Ribeiro – Thun – 2016–17
Tomás Ribeiro – Grasshopper – 2021–
Carlos Saleiro – Servette – 2011–12
André Santos – Grasshopper – 2021–
Nuno Santos – Yverdon-Sport – 2000–01
Daniel Soares – Servette – 2011–12
Tomás Tavares – Basel – 2021–
Jorge Teixeira – Zürich – 2010–14
Toni – Servette – 2004–05
Tote – Grasshopper – 2021–
Bruno Valente – Neuchâtel Xamax – 2002–05
Zé Vítor – St. Gallen – 2007–10

Republic of Ireland 
 Don Givens – Neuchâtel Xamax – 1981–87

Romania 
 Pavel Badea – FC Lausanne-Sport – 1992–95
 Adrian Falub – Basel – 1996–97
 Iulian Filipescu – Zürich – 2003–06
 Ionel Gane – St. Gallen, Grasshopper – 1999–04
 Gábor Gerstenmájer – Luzern – 1993–95
 Ovidiu Herea – Sion – 2013–15
 Cristian Ianu – Aarau, Luzern, Sion – 2007–12, 2014–15
 Adrian Ilie – Zürich – 2004–05
 Viorel Moldovan – Neuchâtel Xamax, Grasshopper, Servette – 1995–98, 2004–05
 George Ogăraru – Sion – 2010–12
 Ion Olaru – FC Lausanne-Sport – 1992–93
 Daniel Oprița – Aarau – 2008–09
 Basarab Panduru – Neuchâtel Xamax – 1995–96
 Costel Pană – Neuchâtel Xamax – 1995–97
 Dan Potocianu – Servette, Basel – 1997–00
 Mihai Tararache – Grasshopper, Zürich – 1998–06
 Adrian Toader – FC Lausanne-Sport – 1995–96

Russia 
Fyodor Chalov – Basel – 2021–
Aleksandr Kerzhakov – Zürich – 2015–16
Aleksandr Maslov – Neuchâtel Xamax, Sion – 1998–2000
Anton Mitryushkin – Sion – 2015–20
Igor Shalimov – Lugano – 1995–96

Saudi Arabia 
 Hussein Abdulghani – Neuchâtel Xamax – 2008–09

Senegal 
 Demba Ba – Lugano – 2021–22
 Ibrahima Ba – Thun – 2007–08
 Papa Malick Ba – Basel – 2005–08
 Henri Camara – Neuchâtel Xamax, Grasshopper – 1999–2001
 Mamadou Camara – Bellinzona – 2010–11
 Matar Coly – Neuchâtel Xamax, Young Boys, FC Lausanne-Sport – 2005–06, 2007–10, 2013–14
 Moustapha Dabo – Sion – 2006–07, 2009–10
Mory Diaw – FC Lausanne-Sport – 2020–22
 Papa Bouba Diop – Neuchâtel Xamax, Grasshopper – 2000–02
 Pape Malick Diop – Neuchâtel Xamax – 2000–01
Moussa Djitté – Sion – 2018–19
 Pape Omar Faye – Thun – 2005–06, 2007–08
 Ibrahima Gueye – Sion – 2015–16
 Saidou Kébé – Zürich, Delémont – 1999–2001, 2002–03
 Pape Moussa Konaté – Sion – 2014–18
 Moussa Koné – Zürich – 2015–16, 2017–18
 Kader Mangane – Neuchâtel Xamax, Young Boys – 2001–06, 2007–08
 Ibrahima Ndiaye – Luzern – 2019–
Birama Ndoye – Sion – 2012–20
 Cheikh Niasse – Young Boys – 2021–
 Ibrahima Niasse – Neuchâtel Xamax – 2008–11
Diafra Sakho – Neuchâtel Xamax – 2019–20
Sangoné Sarr – Zürich – 2014–16, 2017–19
 Kaly Sene – Basel – 2020–
 Ibrahim Tall – FC Lausanne-Sport – 2011–13
 Pape Thiaw – FC Lausanne-Sport – 2000–02
 Boubacar Traorè – St. Gallen – 2020–
 Demba Touré – Grasshopper – 2004–09

Serbia 
Danijel Aleksić – St. Gallen – 2015–18
 Nemanja Antonov – Grasshopper – 2015–18
Nikola Boranijašević – FC Lausanne-Sport – 2020–
 Vidak Bratić – St. Gallen – 2008–09
Lazar Ćirković – Luzern – 2017–20
Nikola Čumić – Luzern – 2021–
 Dušan Cvetinović – Grasshopper – 2010–11
Aleksandar Cvetković – Grasshopper – 2017–19
 Darko Damjanović – Wil 1900 – 2002–03
 Ivan Ergić – Basel – 2000–09
 Milan Gajić – Luzern, Zürich, Grasshopper, Young Boys – 2007–17
Vladimir Golemić – FC Lugano – 2017–18
 Dejan Janjatović – St. Gallen, Vaduz – 2012–17
 Nebojša Joksimović – Neuchâtel Xamax – 2007–08
 Andrija Kaluđerović – Thun – 2014–15
 Ilija Katić – Zürich, Neuchâtel Xamax – 1973–76, 1977–78
 Miloš Krstić – Thun – 2012–14
 Sanijel Kucani – St. Gallen – 2015–16
 Zdravko Kuzmanović – Basel – 2005–07, 2015–16, 2018–
 Leo Lerinc – St. Gallen – 2002–03
 Radomir Milosavljević – Lugano – 2017–18
 Dragan Mrđa – Sion – 2010–13
 Ognjen Mudrinski – Aarau – 2014–15
 Đorđe Nikolić – Basel, FC Thun – 2016–18
 Goran Obradović – Servette, St. Gallen, Sion – 2001–05, 2006–12
Strahinja Pavlović – Basel – 2021–22
 Marko Perović – Basel – 2007–09
 Aleksandar Prijović – Sion, FC Lausanne-Sport – 2009–12
Samir Ramizi – Winterthur – 2022–
 Slobodan Santrač – Grasshopper – 1974–76
Dejan Sorgić – Luzern, Thun – 2006–07, 2008–13, 2016–
Miralem Sulejmani – Young Boys – 2015–20
Vaso Vasić – Grasshopper – 2014–18
 Dušan Veškovac – Luzern, Young Boys – 2007–14
 Milan Vilotić – Grasshopper, Young Boys, St. Gallen – 2012–19

Sierra Leone 
 Umaru Bangura – Zürich – 2017–
 Mohamed Kallon – Lugano – 1995–97

Slovakia 
Michal Faško – Grasshopper – 2017–18
 Ľubomír Guldan – Thun – 2007–08
Christián Herc – Grasshopper – 2021–
Jakub Kadak – Luzern – 2022–
 Miroslav König – Grasshopper, Basel, Zürich – 1999–2003
 Peter Lérant – Luzern – 2000–01
 Ľubomír Tupta – Sion – 2020–
 Marián Zeman – Grasshopper – 1999–2000

Slovenia 
 Džengis Čavušević – St. Gallen, Zürich – 2012–16, 2017–18
 Žan Celar – Lugano – 2021–
 Domen Črnigoj – Zürich – 2015–20
Kenan Fatkič – Thun – 2018–20
Blaž Kramer – Zürich – 2019–
 Klemen Lavrič – St. Gallen – 2010–11
 Sandi Lovrić – Lugano – 2019–
 Miha Mevlja – FC Lausanne-Sport – 2013–14
 Denis Popović – Zürich – 2019–20
 Ermin Šiljak – Servette – 1998–2001
 Andraž Šporar – Basel – 2015–17
 Sašo Udovič – FC Lausanne-Sport – 2001–02

South Africa 
 Delron Buckley – Basel – 2006–07
 Shaun Bartlett – Zürich – 1998–2000
 Stanton Fredericks – Grasshopper – 2000–01
 Bjorn Gugger
 George Koumantarakis – Luzern, Basel – 1998–2003
 Thomas Madigage – Zürich – 1990–91
 August Makalakalane – Zürich – 1990–92
 Phil Masinga – St. Gallen – 1996–97
 Ivan McKinley – Neuchâtel Xamax – 1994–95
 Teboho Mokoena – St. Gallen – 2001–02
Joel Untersee – Vaduz, Zürich – 2014–16, 2018–19

South Korea 
 Park Joo-ho – Basel – 2011–13
 Park Jung-bin – Servette – 2019–20
 Jeong Sang-bin – Grasshopper – 2021–

Spain 
 Ángel Javier Arizmendi – Neuchâtel Xamax – 2011–12
 Manuel Calvo – Aarau – 2000–02
 Álex Carbonell – Luzern – 2020–
 Arnau Comas – Basel – 2022–
 Gabri – Sion, FC Lausanne-Sport – 2011–14
 Alexandre Geijo – Neuchâtel Xamax – 2000–01
 Adrià Guerrero – Lugano – 2020–
 Diego León – Grasshopper – 2006–08
 Sergio López – Basel – 2021–
 David Navarro – Neuchâtel Xamax – 2011–12
Hugo Novoa – Basel – 2022–
Jordi Quintillà – St. Gallen, Basel – 2018–
 Marco Pérez – Basel, Delemont – 1997–2000
Víctor Ruiz – St. Gallen – 2018–
 Víctor Sánchez – Neuchâtel Xamax – 2011–12
Maikel Santana – Neuchâtel Xamax – 2018–19
 Néstor Susaeta – FC Lausanne-Sport – 2011–12
 Guillermo Vallori – Grasshopper – 2007–12
 Carlos Varela – Servette, Basel, Aarau, Young Boys, Neuchâtel Xamax – 1991–2012

Sweden 
 Mattias Andersson – Sion – 2019–
Nabil Bahoui – Grasshopper – 2017–19
 Erol Bekir – Young Boys, Lugano – 1995–99
 Emil Bergström – Grasshopper, Basel – 2016–18, 2019–20
 Tomas Brolin – Zürich – 1995–96
 Dusan Djuric – Zürich, Aarau – 2007–12, 2014–15
 Alexander Farnerud – Young Boys – 2010–13
 Alexander Fransson – Basel, FC Lausanne-Sport – 2015–18
 Alexander Gerndt – Young Boys, Lugano – 2012–
 Ove Grahn – Grasshopper, FC Lausanne-Sport – 1966–76
 Linus Hallenius – Aarau – 2013–14
 Mikael Ishak – St. Gallen – 2012–13
 Kim Källström – Grasshopper – 2015–17
 Benjamin Kibebe – Luzern – 2010–12
Benjamin Kimpioka – Luzern – 2022–
 Roger Ljung – Young Boys, Zürich – 1989–91
 Mats Magnusson – Servette – 1985–86
 Richard Magyar – Aarau – 2014–15
 Daniel Majstorović – Basel – 2005–08
 Stefan Rehn – FC Lausanne-Sport – 1995–2000
 Behrang Safari – Basel – 2008–11, 2013–16
 Emra Tahirović – Zürich – 2007–11
 Jonas Thern – Zürich – 1987–88
 Conny Torstensson – Zürich – 1977–78

Thailand 
 Suree Sukha – Grasshopper – 2007–08

Togo 
Yao Aziawonou – Sion, Basel, Thun, Servette, Young Boys, Luzern – 1998–99, 2000–07
Mohamed Kader – Lugano, Servette – 1999–2000, 2002–04
Thibault Klidjé – Luzern – 2022–
Yao Junior Sènaya – Thun – 2005–06

Tunisia 
 Wajdi Bouazzi – FC Lausanne-Sport – 2013–14
 Aymen Bouchhioua – Aarau – 2007–08
 Seifedin Chabbi – St. Gallen – 2016–17
 Amine Chermiti – Zürich – 2009–16
 Yassine Chikhaoui – Zürich – 2007–15
 Oussama Darragi – Sion – 2012–13
Mohamed Dräger – Luzern – 2021–
 Saïf Ghezal – Young Boys, Thun – 2007–10, 2011–13
 Mohamed Gouaida – St. Gallen – 2016–17
Karim Haggui – St. Gallen – 2016–18
 Ammar Jemal – Young Boys – 2010–11
 Sliman Kchouk – St. Gallen – 2018–
 Salim Khelifi – FC Lausanne-Sport, Zürich – 2011–14, 2018–20
Sayfallah Ltaief – Basel – 2022–
Hadj Mahmoud – Lugano – 2021–
 Ferid Matri – Zürich – 2013–15
 Yassin Mikari – Grasshopper, Luzern – 2001–03, 2006–09, 2013–14
 Stéphane Nater – Servette, St. Gallen – 2011–14
 Francileudo Santos – Zürich – 2006–07
 Chaker Zouaghi – Zürich – 2010–12

Turkey 
Harun Alpsoy – Grasshoppers – 2015–17
Çağdaş Atan – Basel – 2009–11
Tunahan Cicek – St. Gallen – 2010–11
Batuhan Karadeniz – St. Gallen – 2015–16
Berkan Kutlu – Sion – 2019–20
Ercüment Şahin – Zürich, Chiasso – 1990–91, 1992–94
Serkan Şahin – Basel – 2008–10
Dilaver Satılmış – Luzern, Wil 1900 – 1999–2000, 2002–03
Salih Uçan – Sion – 2017–18

Ukraine 
 Yevhen Lutsenko – FC Lausanne-Sport – 1999–2002
 Serhiy Skachenko – Neuchâtel Xamax, Aarau – 2000–01, 2002–03
Bohdan Vyunnyk – Zürich – 2022–

United States 
 Frankie Hejduk – St. Gallen – 2001–02
Kekuta Manneh – St. Gallen – 2018–19
 Jordan Pefok– Young Boys – 2020–
 Caleb Stanko – Vaduz – 2016–17

Uruguay 
 Rodrigo Aguirre – Lugano – 2016–17
 Joaquín Ardaiz – Lugano – 2020–21
 Fernando Carreño – Young Boys, Aarau – 2004–07
 Andrés Lamas – Luzern – 2014–15
 Matías Malvino – Lugano – 2015–16
 Kevin Méndez – FC Lausanne-Sport – 2016–17
 Richard Núñez – Grasshopper – 2001–04
 Rodrigo Pollero – Zürich – 2021–
 Enzo Ruiz – Grasshopper, Bellinzona – 2009–13
 Jonathan Sabbatini – Lugano – 2015–

Venezuela 
 Gabriel Cichero – Sion – 2013–14, 2015–16
 Frank Feltscher – Grasshopper, Bellinzona, Aarau – 2006–15
 Rolf Feltscher – Grasshopper, FC Lausanne-Sport – 2007–10, 2013–14
 Alexander David González – Young Boys, Aarau, Thun – 2011–16
 Josef Martínez – Young Boys, Thun – 2011–14
 Andrés Ponce – Lugano – 2016–17
 Pedro Antonio Ramírez – Sion – 2014–15
Jeffrén Suárez – Grasshopper – 2017–19

Zambia 
Miguel Chaiwa – Young Boys – 2022–
Emmanuel Mayuka – Young Boys – 2010–12
Nathan Sinkala – Grasshopper – 2014–15
Fwayo Tembo – Basel – 2010–12

Zimbabwe 
 Benjani Mwaruwari – Grasshopper – 2001–02
 Adam Ndlovu – Kriens, Delémont, Zürich – 1997–98, 1999–2001
 Agent Sawu – Kriens, Luzern, Young Boys, Basel – 1993–2000

Notes 

Swiss Super League
foreign
foreign
Expatriate footballers in Switzerland
Association football player non-biographical articles